Athens County is a county in southeastern Ohio. As of the 2020 census, the population was 62,431. Its county seat and largest city is Athens. The county was formed in 1805 from Washington County. Because the original state university (Ohio University) was founded there in 1804, the town and the county were named for the ancient center of learning, Athens, Greece.

Athens County comprises the Athens, OH Micropolitan Statistical Area.

Geography

Athens County is located in the Unglaciated Allegheny Plateau region of Ohio. It features steep, rugged hills, with typical relief of 150 to 400 feet, deeply dissected by stream valleys, many of them remnant from the ancient Teays River drainage system. Most of Athens County is within the Hocking River watershed, with smaller areas in the Shade River and Raccoon Creek watersheds. The Hocking River joins the Ohio River at the unincorporated village of Hockingport in Athens County.

Adjacent counties
Perry County (north)
Morgan County (northeast)
Washington County (east)
Wood County, West Virginia (southeast)
Meigs County (south)
Vinton County (west)
Hocking County (northwest)

Demographics

2000 census
As of the census of 2000, there were 62,223 people, 22,501 households, and 12,713 families living in the county. The population density was 123 people per square mile (47/km2). There were 24,901 housing units at an average density of 49 per square mile (19/km2). The racial makeup of the county was 93.48% White, 2.39% Black or African American, 0.28% Native American, 1.90% Asian, 0.02% Pacific Islander, 0.36% from other races, and 1.56% from two or more races. 1.03% of the population were Hispanic or Latino of any race. 21.4% were of German, 13.9% American, 12.9% Irish, 11.1% English, and 5.6% Italian ancestry according to Census 2000.

There were 22,501 households, out of which 26.40% had children under the age of 18 living with them, 43.50% were married couples living together, 9.20% had a female householder with no husband present, and 43.50% were non-families. 28.30% of all households were made up of individuals, and 8.30% had someone living alone who was 65 years of age or older. The average household size was 2.40 and the average family size was 2.92.

In the county, the population was spread out, with 18.30% under the age of 18, 30.70% from 18 to 24, 23.70% from 25 to 44, 18.00% from 45 to 64, and 9.30% who were 65 years of age or older. The median age was 26 years. For every 100 females there were 95.60 males. For every 100 females age 18 and over, there were 93.30 males.

The median income for a household in the county was $27,322, and the median income for a family was $39,785. Males had a median income of $30,776 versus $23,905 for females. The per capita income for the county was $14,171. About 14.00% of families and 27.40% of the population were below the poverty line, including 21.20% of those under age 18 and 12.90% of those age 65 or over.

2010 census
As of the 2010 United States Census, there were 64,757 people, 23,578 households, and 12,453 families living in the county. The racial makeup of the county was 91.8% white, 2.7% black or African American, 2.7% Asian, 0.3% American Indian, 0.4% from other races, and 2.1% from two or more races. Those of Hispanic or Latino origin made up 1.5% of the population. In terms of ancestry, 22.1% were German, 15.2% were American, 14.0% were Irish, 10.4% were English, and 5.5% were Italian.

Of the 23,578 households, 24.3% had children under the age of 18 living with them, 39.3% were married couples living together, 9.2% had a female householder with no husband present, 47.2% were non-families, and 30.0% of all households were made up of individuals. The average household size was 2.35 and the average family size was 2.87. The median age was 26.3 years.

The median income for a household in the county was $31,559 and the median income for a family was $48,170. Males had a median income of $38,135 versus $31,263 for females. The per capita income for the county was $16,642. About 16.6% of families and 30.3% of the population were below the poverty line, including 29.6% of those under age 18 and 9.2% of those age 65 or over.

Communities

Cities
Athens (county seat)
Nelsonville

Villages

Albany
Amesville
Buchtel
Chauncey
Coolville
Glouster
Jacksonville
Trimble

Townships

Alexander
Ames
Athens
Bern
Canaan
Carthage
Dover
Lee
Lodi
Rome
Trimble
Troy
Waterloo
York

https://web.archive.org/web/20160715023447/http://www.ohiotownships.org/township-websites

Census-designated places
 Hockingport
 Millfield
 New Marshfield
 Stewart
 The Plains

Unincorporated communities

 Beaumont
 Beebe
 Bessemer
 Big Run
 Burr Oak
 Canaanville
 Carbondale
 Doanville
 Frost
 Garden
 Glen Ebon
 Guysville
 Hamley Run
 Hartleyville
 Hebardville
 Liars Corner
 Lottridge
 Luhrig
 Mineral
 Modoc
 New England
 New Floodwood
 Pleasanton
 Pratts Fork
 Redtown
 Shade
 Sharpsburg
 Torch
 Utley

Ghost towns
 Ingham
 King's Station

Politics
 
Like most counties dominated by state universities, Athens County is a Democratic stronghold. It was one of only two counties in Ohio to vote for George McGovern over Richard Nixon in 1972 (along with Lucas County) and in the 2014 gubernatorial election, it was one of only two counties to vote for Democrat Ed FitzGerald over Republican John Kasich (along with Monroe County). From 2016-20, as Ohio has veered rightward, Athens County has become the lone base of Democratic strength in Appalachian Ohio.

|}

Economy
The largest employer in Athens County is Ohio University. Other significant employers include Appalachian Behavioral Healthcare, Hocking College, Diagnostic Hybrids, O'Bleness Memorial Hospital, Rocky Brands, Stewart-MacDonald, Wayne National Forest, and a growing number of retail stores and restaurants. Local government, local school districts, and nonprofit organizations employ many county residents.

Historically, the first large-scale industry was salt production. Coal mining and timber harvesting played major roles in Athens County's economy, as did the treatment and care of the mentally ill.

The coal industry has declined dramatically from its peak years. Only Buckingham Coal is still mining in the county, in Trimble Township north of Glouster. Gravel and limestone are mined at several quarries in the county. Active oil and natural gas wells are found in low numbers throughout Athens County.

Forestry still contributes to the Athens County economy, both in the private sector and in the public sector. The headquarters for Wayne National Forest is located between Athens and Nelsonville.

Farming and market gardening continue to thrive in the area. The largest farms specialize in beef and dairy production. The Athens Farmers Market, an outdoor market, continues to grow in popularity. Local and organically grown produce is found in abundance during the summer months.

Also, tourism is a large and growing component of the county's economy. The county is a regional music center and home to many arts and crafts businesses. Many visitors to the county are drawn to its natural resources and abundant wildlife. Hunting and fishing are popular activities in season. The county has over 19 miles of paved bike path in and between Athens and Nelsonville. Hiking and mountain biking are popular throughout the county, especially in the state parks and national forest.

Higher education remains the cornerstone of the county's economy. Over one-quarter of the county's residents either attend or work at Hocking College or Ohio University.

Education

Colleges and universities

Athens County is home to Hocking College in Nelsonville and Ohio University in the City of Athens.

K-12 schools
The residents of Athens County are served by the five school districts:  the Alexander Local School District, Athens City School District, the Federal Hocking Local School District, Nelsonville-York City School District, and the Trimble Local School District.

Libraries
They are also served by the Athens County Public Libraries with branches in Albany, Athens, Chauncey, Coolville, Glouster, Nelsonville, and The Plains.

Media
News publications
The Athens Messenger, a daily paper published by the Adams Publishing Group, which also owns The Athens News.
The Athens News, a free semiweekly tabloid.
The Post, the student newspaper of Ohio University
The Spire, the student newspaper of Hocking College, is published on an occasional basis

Noncommercial Television
WOUB-TV, 20 and 27-HD (PBS affiliate, Ohio University, Athens)

Noncommercial Radio
WEAK-FM, 106.7, (Low Power FM, Athens)
WOUB-FM, 91.3 (NPR affiliate, Ohio University, Athens)
WOUB-AM, 1340 (NPR affiliate, Ohio University, Athens)
WLCI-FM, 97.5 (Hocking College student radio, Nelsonville)

Commercial Radio
WXTQ-FM, 105.5 (Athens)
WJKW-FM, 95.9 (Athens)
WATH-AM, 970 (Athens)
WSEO-FM, 107.7 (Nelsonville)
WAIS-AM, 770 (Nelsonville)

Public lands

Federal lands
Belleville Lock and Dam Public Access Area (Troy Township)
Tom Jenkins Dam (at Burr Oak State Park, Trimble Township)
Wayne National Forest (Dover, York, Trimble, Canaan Townships)

State lands
Burr Oak State Park
Strouds Run State Park
Acadia Cliffs State Nature Preserve
Fox Lake Wildlife Area
Waterloo Wildlife Research Station
Marie J. Desonier State Nature Preserve
Riddle State Nature Preserve
Gifford State Forest
Waterloo State Forest
Zaleski State Forest

County properties
Ferndale Park
County Farm
Hockhocking-Adena Bike Path
Moonville Rail-Trail

See also
National Register of Historic Places listings in Athens County, Ohio

Notes

References

Further reading

 Thomas William Lewis, History of Southeastern Ohio and the Muskingum Valley, 1788-1928. In Three Volumes. Chicago: S.J. Clarke Publishing Co., 1928.

External links
Athens County Government
Athens County Convention and Visitors Bureau
Map of Athens County public lands
Athens County history and genealogy

 
Appalachian Ohio
Counties of Appalachia
Ohio counties on the Ohio River
1805 establishments in Ohio
Populated places established in 1805